Herbert Marcuse (1898–1979) was a German-American Marxist philosopher and prominent member of the Frankfurt School.

Marcuse may also refer to:

Surname 
 Charley Marcuse, hot dog vendor
 Gary Marcuse, Canadian documentary filmmaker
 Harold Marcuse (born 1957), professor of modern German history at the University of California, Santa Barbara; grandson of Herbert Marcuse
 Herman Marcuse (born 17 April 1919), career attorney in the Office of Legal Counsel
 Irene Marcuse, American novelist; granddaughter of Herbert Marcuse
 Judith Marcuse (born 1947), Canadian dancer and choreographer
 Ludwig Marcuse (1894–1971), Jewish German philosopher
 Max Marcuse (1877–1963), German dermatologist and sexologist
 Peter Marcuse, professor emeritus of Urban Planning at Columbia University; son of Herbert Marcuse
 Theo Marcuse, American character actor
 Rudolf Marcuse (1878–1940), German sculptor

Other uses 
 Marcuse Pfeifer (1936–2020), American gallerist
 Hasker and Marcuse Factory, a historic factory building located in Richmond, Virginia

See also